Pwo language may refer to:
Pwo Karen languages (Burma)
Phuie language (Burkina)